Below are the squads for the men's football tournament at the 2014 Asian Games, played in South Korea.

Group A

Laos
Coach:  Dave Booth

Malaysia
Coach: Ong Kim Swee

Saudi Arabia
Coach:  Lorenzo Antolínez

South Korea
Coach: Lee Kwang-jong

Group B

Afghanistan
Coach: Zahir Khodadad

Bangladesh
Coach:  Lodewijk de Kruif

Hong Kong
Coach:  Kim Pan-gon

Uzbekistan
Coach: Mirjalol Qosimov

Group C

Oman
Coach: Hamad Al-Azani

Palestine
Coach: Abdelnasser Barakat

Singapore
Coach: Aide Iskandar

Tajikistan
Coach: Mukhsin Mukhamadiev

Group D

Iraq
Coach: Hakeem Shaker

Japan
Coach: Makoto Teguramori

Kuwait
Coach: Ali Al-Shammari

Nepal
Coach:  Jack Stefanowski

Group E

East Timor
Coach:  Antonio Carlos Vieira

Indonesia
Coach: Aji Santoso

Maldives
Coach:  Drago Mamić

Thailand
Coach: Kiatisuk Senamuang

Group F

China
Coach: Fu Bo

North Korea
Coach: Yun Jong-su

Pakistan
Coach:  Mohamed Al-Shamlan

Group G

India
Coach:  Wim Koevermans

Jordan
Coach: Jamal Abu-Abed

United Arab Emirates
Coach: Ali Ebrahim

Group H

Iran
Coach:  Nelo Vingada

Kyrgyzstan
Coach: Mirlan Eshenov

Vietnam
Coach:  Toshiya Miura

References

Squads

External links
Official website

Men
2014